Joseph E.B. Lumbard (born 1969) is an American Muslim scholar of Islamic studies and associate professor of Quranic studies at the College of Islamic Studies at Hamad Bin Khalifa University in Qatar. He is the author, editor, and translator of several scholarly books and many articles on Islamic philosophy, Sufism, and Quranic studies. He has been considered a leader of the Perennialists movement within Islam.

Biography

Born and raised in Washington D.C., Lumbard was brought up within the Episcopal Church, serving as an altar boy.  In his teenage years he lost interest and he was introduced to Islam when a sophomore at George Washington University.  He converted to Islam a year and a half later.

He received a Ph.D. and M.Phil. in Islamic Studies from Yale University, an M.A. in Religious Studies and a B.A. from the George Washington University. In order to complement his Western university training, he studied Qur´an, Hadith, Sufism, and Islamic philosophy with traditional teachers in Morocco, Egypt, Yemen, and Iran. Lumbard began his teaching career at the American University in Cairo (2002-2005) after receiving a PhD in Islamic studies from Yale University. After serving as an advisor for interfaith affairs to King Abdullah II of Jordan, he became the director of the Islamic and Middle Eastern Studies Program at Brandeis University. He has also served as an assistant professor of Arabic and Translation Studies at the American University of Sharjah.

Lumbard has lectured in academic arenas around the world, participated in inter-faith dialogues, and appeared on several radio and television programs. He is also the founder and first director of the Islamic Research Institute.

Bibliography
 Aḥmad al-Ghazālī, Remembrance and the Metaphysics of Love (SUNY Press, 2016)
 The Study Quran, (Translator, commentary writer and General Editor) (HarperOne, Fall 2015)
 "Seyyed Hossein Nasr on Tradition and Modernity" in Tradition and Modernity ed. David Marshall (Georgetown University Press, 2014) 
 "What of the Word is Common" in Muslim and Christian Understanding: Theory and Application of "A common Word" ed. Waleed El-Ansary and David K. Linnan (Praeger, 2012)
From Hubb to 'Ishq: The Development of Love in Early Sufism, (Oxford Journal of Islamic Studies, 2008).
Submission, Faith and Beauty: The Religion of Islam., (Hayward, 2007, Zaytuna Institute, 2008)
Prophets and Messengers of God, "Voices of Islam", (Praeger Pub Text, 2007)
Islam, Fundamentalism, and the Betrayal of Tradition, (World Wisdom, 2004)
"The Function of Dhikrullāh in Sufi Psychology" in Knowledge is Light: Essays in Islamic Studies ed. Zaylan Morris (Kazi Publications: 2003)

See also
King Abdullah II of Jordan
Sufism
Seyyed Hossein Nasr
Mohammed Rustom
Caner Dagli
Maria Massi Dakake

References

External links
 Academia.edu profile

Columbian College of Arts and Sciences alumni
Brandeis University faculty
American editors
American former Protestants
Critics of Islamism
Converts to Sunni Islam from Protestantism
Scholars of Sufism
Living people
Yale University alumni
People from Washington, D.C.
American Sunni Muslim scholars of Islam
1969 births
Translators of the Quran into English
Muslim scholars of Islamic studies